Alexandra Ndolo (born 13 August 1986) is a German-born  left-handed épée fencer who fences for Kenya from 2022 on. 

She was born in Bayreuth, Northern Bavaria, Germany, and her father was from Kenya. 

She represented Germany at the 2013 Summer Universiade held in Kazan, Russia. She competed in the women's épée event at the World Fencing Championships in 2015, 2017 and 2019.

She won the silver medal in the women's épée event at the 2017 European Fencing Championships held in Tbilisi, Georgia.

She won one of the bronze medals in her event at the 2019 European Fencing Championships held in Düsseldorf, Germany. She also competed at the 2022 European Fencing Championships held in Antalya, Turkey.

She won the silver medal in the women's épée event at the 2022 World Fencing Championships held in Cairo, Egypt.

References

External links 
 

Living people
1986 births
Place of birth missing (living people)
German female fencers
German épée fencers
Left-handed fencers
Competitors at the 2013 Summer Universiade
21st-century German women
World Fencing Championships medalists